Doonside railway station is located on the Main Western line, serving the Sydney suburb of Doonside. It is served by Sydney Trains T1 Western line services.

History
Doonside station opened on 27 September 1880.

It was renamed Wolkara on 1 February 1921, before resuming its original name 12 days later. The station was rebuilt in the 1950s when the Main Western line was electrified.

The station is as of 2022 being upgraded to include elevators and disabled access.

Platforms & services

Transport links
Busways operates two routes to and from Doonside station:
726: to Blacktown station
753: to Blacktown station via Quakers Hill

Doonside station is served by one NightRide route:
N70: Penrith station to Town Hall station).

References

External links

Doonside station details Transport for New South Wales

Main Western railway line, New South Wales
Railway stations in Sydney
Railway stations in Australia opened in 1880
City of Blacktown